The Grove Street Historic District is located in Barneveld, Wisconsin.

History
The district is one of the few locations in Barneveld left largely unchanged after the 1984 Barneveld, Wisconsin tornado outbreak. It was listed on the National Register of Historic Places in 1986 and on the State Register of Historic Places in 1989.

References

Historic districts on the National Register of Historic Places in Wisconsin
National Register of Historic Places in Iowa County, Wisconsin